The ride cymbal is a standard cymbal in most drum kits. Its function in the kit is to maintain a beat, sometimes called a ride pattern, rather than the accent of a crash. It is normally placed on the extreme right (or dominant hand) of a drum set, above the floor tom.

The ride can fulfill any function or rhythm the hi-hat does, with the exception of an open and closed sound.

The ride is played with a drumstick.

Terminology 

The term ride means to ride with the music, describing the cymbal's sustain after it is struck. The term may depict either the function or characteristic of the instrument. Most cymbal makers manufacture specific cymbals for the purpose.

Some drummers use a china cymbal, a sizzle cymbal or a specialized tone such as a swish or pang cymbal as a ride cymbal. When playing extremely softly, when using brushes, and when recording, even a thin crash may serve well as a ride cymbal.

On the other extreme, when playing extremely loudly, a cymbal designed as a ride may serve well as a very loud, long crash.

Crash/ride

Cymbals designated crash/ride or more rarely ride/crash serve as either a large slow crash or secondary ride, or in very small kits as the only suspended cymbal.

Flat ride

Bell-less ride cymbals, known as flat rides, have a dry crash and clear stick definition. Quieter, they are popular in jazz drumming. Developed by Paiste in the 1960s, flat rides are used by notable drummers Roy Haynes, Jack DeJohnette, Paul Wertico, Carter Beauford, Jo Jones and Charlie Watts.

The highly regarded Paiste 602 Flat Ride was reissued in 2010, but is only available in 20" medium.

Swish and pang

Swish and pang cymbals are exotic ride and crash/ride cymbals similar to china cymbals in tone.

Sizzle cymbal

A sizzle cymbal, thinner and one size larger than the main ride, was common in some styles of early rock music as a secondary ride cymbal, particularly for accompanying guitar lead breaks.

Pattern

Modern use of the ride cymbal was inspired by Baby Dodds's press roll rhythms.

The most basic ride pattern in rock and other styles is:

In jazz, this would normally be played with a swing.

Sound
When struck, a ride cymbal makes a sustained, shimmering sound rather than the shorter, decaying sound of a crash cymbal. Smaller and thinner cymbals tend to be darker with more shimmer, while larger and thicker cymbals tend to respond better in louder volume situations, and conversely. The very thickest and loudest tend to be about 22 inches, with larger rides restricted to medium and medium thin thicknesses.

In rock or jazz, the ride cymbal is most often struck regularly in a rhythmic pattern as part of the accompaniment to the song. Often the drummer will vary between the same pattern either on the hi-hat cymbal or the ride cymbal, playing for example the hi-hat in the verses and the ride in the instrumentals and/or choruses.

The sound of a ride cymbal also varies depending on what kind of mallet is used to hit it. In rock and metal, wood and nylon-tipped drum sticks are common; wood creates a smoother, quieter sound, whereas nylon tips create more of a "ping". It creates a low vibration to keep a steady beat, but a low sound volume. The bell, the bulge in the center of the cymbal, creates a brighter, less sustained sound. The bell creates such a brilliant tone compared to the subtle sound of the bow that it is often used as somewhat of another cymbal. Some ride cymbals, seen more often in various forms of metal and harder subgenres of rock, have an unusually large bell. This lessens the accuracy required to repeatedly hit the bell in fast patterns, and produces a louder, brighter tone than in most ride-cymbal bells.

Sources

Cymbals
Drum kit components
Drum patterns
Rhythm and meter